The Honda NSR500V is a race motorcycle from the Honda NSR series. It was designed and manufactured by HRC and debuted in 1996 for the Grand Prix motorcycle racing's 500 cc class. The bike was conceived by Honda to be a viable machine for privateer teams to enter the class.

Characteristics
The V-twin water-cooled two-stroke used the same crankcase reed-valve induction as the Honda NSR500 V4. The 100-degree V2 also used a single crankshaft, a feature common to all of Honda's GP race bikes of the time. Weighing in at 103 kg, it produced a claimed  when running on hi-octane avgas. Although it made less power than its V4 counterpart (some 40-50 hp less), it was lighter, easier to ride and better handling. At many circuits it was capable of lapping just as fast as a V4, given a clear track. Its main strength was being able to carry a higher corner speed than the V4. However its weakness became apparent in traffic. If the V2 lost its momentum through the corner, a V4 was able to use its better acceleration and power to pull away. It was nevertheless to fulfil its purpose of being a competitive and realistic machine for private teams.

Racing history
Initially Honda ran two fully works-supported bikes in 1996 as part of the established Repsol squad, the bikes being ridden by Tadayuki Okada and Shinichi Itoh. The machine made an immediate impact with Okada securing pole position for its maiden race in 1996, in Malaysia. Okada was to bring the new bike home in the Top 5 on six occasions, its best finish being a 2nd at the final race in Australia. When the Grand Prix season had finished, Honda also entered the V2 in the MFJ Grand Prix Superbike Race which pitted most of the top Grand Prix teams against each other in a one-off race at Sugo. Okada won the event on the V2, ahead of the established V4s from Honda, Suzuki and Yamaha.

Honda continued to develop the V2 over the winter of 1996 and again entered the V2 as a works machine in 1997, this time piloted by Takuma Aoki. The bike proved competitive scoring seven Top 5 placings, its best being 2nd in Australia. The V2 was also sold to private teams, among them the newly formed Gresini Racing Team with rider Alex Barros who got onto the podium at Donington and finished the season 9th (ahead of six factory V4 bikes).

Over the course of 1998 and 1999, Sete Gibernau, who replaced the injured Takuma Aoki rode the official V2 and reached the podium on two more occasions. More private teams had also purchased V2 machines and by 2000, the machine had become a realistic option for privateers to compete in the category, with the bikes being consistently able to finish in the points. In 2000 Jurgen van den Goorbergh won Best Privateer, with Haruchika Aoki winning the same award the following year – both on board NSR500Vs.

The introduction of rules allowing four-stroke machines to enter the class in 2002 effectively put an end to the competitiveness of the two-stroke V2 as even the two-stroke V4 machines quickly became obsolete.

Only 22 NSR500v motorcycles were produced by Honda Racing Corporation. There were 20 NSR500v motorcycles produced from 1996 to 2000. The NSR500v engine suffered from a fragile transmission.  For the 2001 season Honda Racing Corporation updated the engine with a new crankcase set and transmission. In 2001 Honda Racing Corporation produced 2 NSR500v motorcycles which were raced by the Shell Advance Team. Several 2001 updated engines were sold to other NSR500v teams.

Unlike the NSR500V4s which were merely leased out to teams, the V2s were sold to teams, many of whom later sold them outside the Grand Prix arena. Some were campaigned in National races while many ended up in private motorcycle collections.

See also 

Honda NSR500
Aprilia RSW-2 500
Cagiva C593
Suzuki RGV500
Yamaha YZR500
ELF 500 ROC
Sabre V4

References

500 cc qualifying and race results 
Results of the 1996 MFJ Grand Prix Superbike Race 
Honda Press Release on Motorsport Plans, January 1998

NSR500V
Grand Prix motorcycles
Motorcycles introduced in 1996